Joseph Bercegeay (10 December 1896 – 14 May 1958) was a French racing cyclist. He rode in the 1923 Tour de France.

References

1896 births
1958 deaths
French male cyclists
Place of birth missing